Protohepialus is an extinct genus of moth in the family Hepialidae. It contains only one species, Protohepialus comstocki, which was described from a Tortonian marine shale (Upper Miocene) in the Puente Formation of California.

References

Fossil Lepidoptera
Fossil taxa described in 1945
†
Miocene insects
Prehistoric insects of North America
†